Cheese It may refer to:

 Cheese It (film), 1926 Krazy Kat film
 Cheese It, the Cat!, a 1957 Warner Bros. cartoon
 Cheez-It, a cheese cracker